Facebook Stories are short user-generated photo or video collections that can be uploaded to the user's Facebook. Facebook Stories were created on March 28, 2017. They are considered to be a second news feed for the social media website. It is focused around Facebook's in-app camera which allows users to use fun filters and Snapchat-like lenses to their content as well as add visual geolocation tags to their photos and videos. The content is able to be posted publicly on the Facebook app for only 24 hours or can be sent as a direct message to a Facebook friend.

"As people mostly post photos and videos, Stories is the way they’re going to want to do it," says Facebook Camera product manager Connor Hayes, noting Facebook's shift away from text status updates after ten years as its primary sharing option. "Obviously we’ve seen this doing very well in other apps. Snapchat has really pioneered this," explained Hayes. Facebook has seen much success through other applications like Snapchat and Instagram, especially since Facebook bought Instagram for $1 billion in 2012.

History 
After the many failed attempts of trying to incorporate Snapchat-like features on Facebook, the company decided to test run Messenger Day. In 2016, Facebook created a feature called Messenger Day, which allowed users to post videos and pictures with filters for 24 hours only. This project was only used in Poland because of the unpopularity of Snapchat in that region. Users are able to add texts and colorful graphics. However, this was only a test for Facebook to be later turned into a feature on Facebook's app.

Facebook's introduction of the Story function may have been in response to the wider success of Instagram Story advertising over the advertising on Facebook Wall; Instagram Story ads were found to be more successful than Facebook Wall advertising in all demographics aside from non-millennial men.

Popularity and criticism 
, Facebook Stories is much less popular among social media users than Snapchat and Instagram. In August 2016, Instagram stories, which is a part of the Facebook owned Instagram, was created and as of June 2017, had 250 million active users. Mark Zuckerberg states, "It is important to release products that people are familiar with, but (Facebook Stories) is going to have the first mainstream augmented reality platform."
 
In a campaign to get more Facebook users to use Facebook Stories, "Facebook is turning friends into ghosts who aren’t using stories. So, instead of the blank space that used to be there above the news feed, Facebook will show grayed-out icons of some frequently contacted friends, regardless of whether they’ve ever posted to their Facebook story before."

Plugin extensions to Chrome and Firefox have been written specifically to hide Facebook stories. As of September 2019, Facebook itself has so far not created an off option for its users.

Features

Access Stories 
There are two ways that a user can view Facebook Stories. First, by scrolling to the top of the feed, the users are able to view their friends' Stories and create a story. Second, swipe right from any screen on the Facebook app. Users can "like" Stories and reply to them.

Saving Stories 
Before uploading content to a story, users are able to save it to the camera roll. Once users are done creating the story, press the down arrow to save on the camera roll, or the center arrow to share. Users are able to send a direct message to any friends, post to a timeline or add to a Story.

Views 
If users post a story to a  timeline it will appear at the top of the profile as if it were any other picture or video. And just like posting to a Timeline, users can decide who sees it (Public, Friends and so on). But posting to a "Story" will make it available to all friends for a 24-hour period and will appear as a bubble at the top of their feeds. Right now, there's no way to select who sees—or doesn't see—a Story. To delete a story, go to the bottom right of the screen and click view icon tab and can delete a story by pressing on the buttons on the three dots at the top.

Tools 
Facebook is the first app to get animated face filters. The company worked with artists Hattie Stewart and Douglas Coupland to design original filters for the Facebook app. To access lenses, swipe up and down but users have to apply them before recording or taking a picture, which is a key difference between Facebook stories and Snapchat. As well as video stories being 20 seconds and being able to replay a friends direct message.

List of what is included in Facebook Camera:
 Drawing with resizable marker and chalk brushes
 Emoji stickers Colored captions
 Animated selfie lenses and masks
 Environmental effects like highlight lines and funhouse mirrors
 Reactive filters that respond to movement like lava lamp colors
 Alternative filters that surprise you with new effects if you get more people in frame
 Fine-art-style transfers that make your images look like line drawings or impressionist paintings
 Professional artist filters like Hattie Stewart's doodle bombs and Doug Copeland's psychedelia
 Licensed filters from six movie studios, including a Minions filter
 Cause-supporting filters like rainbows for gay pride
 Geotagged location filters for certain places
 Country-specific filters for around ten initial markets

References 

Software features
Computer-related introductions in 2017
Social software
Facebook
 Facebook Stories - Did Facebook Copied Snapchat’s Main Feature?